Belonochasma (meaning "needle mouth") is a genus of reptile from the Mesozoic (possibly Jurassic) of Franconia, Bavaria, Germany. The type species, B. aenigmaticum, was described in 1939. It was once thought to be a pterosaur, but this was rejected by Oskar Kuhn in 1961, and upheld by Peter Wellnhofer in 1978.

See also

 List of pterosaur genera
 Timeline of pterosaur research

References

Mesozoic vertebrates of Europe
Prehistoric vertebrate genera
Fossil taxa described in 1939